The ČD class  814 diesel multiple units (colloquially known as "Regionova") are a development of the prototype 812 613 and replace the earlier class 810 DMUs on local railways České dráhy in the Czech Republic. They are formed as 2 cars (Class 814 Driving Motor + Class 914 Driving Trailer) and 3 cars (814 Driving Motor + 014 Trailer + 814 Driving Motor). They are built by Pars Nova of Šumperk.

Železnice Desná

One unit, numbered 814 501-3/914 501-2 is in use with regional operator Železnice Desná.

References

Diesel multiple units of the Czech Republic
Train-related introductions in 2005